Ingrid Bellemans (born 19 February 1967) is a Belgian former sailor. She competed in the Europe event at the 1996 Summer Olympics.

References

External links
 

1967 births
Living people
Belgian female sailors (sport)
Olympic sailors of Belgium
Sailors at the 1996 Summer Olympics – Europe
People from Vilvoorde
Sportspeople from Flemish Brabant
20th-century Belgian women